M-122 was a state trunkline highway in the US state of Michigan entirely in the city of St. Ignace. The highway connected US Highway 2 (US 2) to the State Highway Ferry Dock used before the Mackinac Bridge was built.  It was retired and the road returned to local control in 1957.

Route description
Prior to the opening of the Mackinac Bridge, travelers wishing to venture from St. Ignace to Mackinaw City had to do so via ferry. M-122 began at US 2 (now Business Loop Interstate 75) near Straits State Park and traveled through town along Ferry Road where it ran southeasterly from the main highway. East of Hornbach Street M-122 curved around to the east near Paro Street. The highway ended at the State Ferry Docks on the southeast side of the city next to the Coast Guard station.

History
M-122 was initially assumed into the state highway system in 1929 as a connector between US 31 and Straits State Park.  In 1936, US 2 was routed into St. Ignace and US 31 was scaled back to end in the Lower Peninsula in Mackinaw City.  M-122 now provided a connection between US 2 and the new docks on the southeast side of the city. It existed in this capacity until 1957 when the Mackinac Bridge opened to traffic.

Major intersections

See also

References

External links

 Former M-122 Route Listing at Michigan Highways

122
Transportation in Mackinac County, Michigan